Liolaemus fitzgeraldi,  Fitzgerald's tree iguana,  is a species of lizard in the family  Liolaemidae. It is native to Chile and Argentina.

References

fitzgeraldi
Reptiles described in 1899
Reptiles of Chile
Reptiles of Argentina
Taxa named by George Albert Boulenger